How My Mother Gave Birth to Me During Menopause is a film by directed by Sébastien Rose, released in 2003. The film won that year's Claude Jutra Award for the best Canadian feature film by a first-time director.

The film's cast includes Micheline Lanctôt, Paul Ahmarani, Lucie Laurier, Sylvie Moreau, Patrick Huard and Anne-Marie Cadieux.

Synopsis 
How My Mother Gave Birth to Me During Her Menopause is about Jean-Charles (Paul Ahmarani), a 30-year-old working on his thesis about men's role in a post-feminist world, who lives with his domineering mother (Micheline Lanctôt) and sister (Sylvie Moreau), both of whom are sleeping with the gardener (Patrick Huard). To further complicate matters, Jean-Charles is having an affair with his shrink (Anne-Marie Cadieux) who reports back to his mother.

References

External links

2003 films
Canadian drama films
Best First Feature Genie and Canadian Screen Award-winning films
2000s French-language films
Films directed by Sébastien Rose
2003 directorial debut films
French-language Canadian films
2000s Canadian films